Wolf Pen is an unincorporated community in Wyoming County, West Virginia, United States, along Indian Creek.

The community took its name from the wolf pen, a device used to trap wolves.

References 

Unincorporated communities in West Virginia
Unincorporated communities in Wyoming County, West Virginia